Marcela Del Sol is an Australian/Chilean writer born  on 10 July 1973 in Antofagasta, Chile, who suffers from dissociative identity disorder.

Del Sol's literature is well known for her dubious views about sexuality and for her crude writing style that fights patriarchy and sexual oppression, and abuse towards children and women.

Del Sol studied Dramatic Arts at NIDA and called herself "an eternal student".

In 2016, Del Sol published Kaleidoscope: My Life's Multiple Reflections, a fiction book based on her experiences with post-traumatic stress disorder and dissociative identity disorder. Her mental disorders were the result of traumatic events, including sexual assault, an armed robbery attack, and a serious car accident.

Del Sol finances and implements art education programs for at-risk children in Chile and elsewhere.

She has been described as an outstanding heart-wrenching writer and her work explores the dark side of life and realities people are afraid or uncomfortable to talk about.

Biography 
Her father is a musician, songwriter and businessman and her mother worked as a theatre actress and Special education teacher. They separated early on. She has one younger brother, Felipe Sebastián who is a musician (composer, guitar player, multi-instrumentalist) and freelancer Computer engineer and Network security expert, who has been the youngest lead guitarist in the history of heavy metal band Panzer and Chilean progressive rock pioneer with the musical trio Elefhante.

Her paternal grandmother Victoria Idalia Campusano was a socialist political figure in the north of Chile and a personal friend and campaigner of Chilean Socialist President Salvador Allende. Her maternal grandfather's family owned the now dissolved Cristobal Inn Hotels chain in Chile, her maternal aunt Aurora Williams Baussa was the Chilean Minister for Mining during President Michelle Bachelet second period.
Del Sol was educated in Instituto Santa Maria, a German Catholic School in Antofagasta, Chile where she was distinguished and awarded for her literary talent.

She met an Australian scientist in Antofagasta, her former husband and the father of her two children, and migrated to Australia in the early 1990s.

She was diagnosed with dissociative identity disorder, posttraumatic stress disorder in 2013, following a number of adverse experiences, including sexual abuse, an accident and decided to come out in the open about her condition on international media. She has been outspoken about eradicating stigma attached to mental health sufferers and has made several appearances in the media to this effect, including a documentary for 60 Minutes, which sparked some hurtful opinions about del Sol that were responded to by Peter Stefanovic and D.I.D. specialist psychiatrist Nick Bendit in support of Marcela.
In 2016 Del Sol was involved in a publicly criticized radio interview with Jackie O and Kyle Sandilands where controversial Sandilands expressed he would like to have sex with del Sol if he were single and proceeded to strip live at her request during one of del Sol's dissociative episodes.

Marcela del Sol lives in Newcastle, Australia where she leads a very private life, opposed to her public image.

She has often stated that she regularly travels to Chile as a way of finding healing and contention for her condition, and uses these times to run creative writing and life mentoring workshops with girls at risk, and feminist education. She finances all her social endeavors.

Marcela del Sol is also the founder of RelacioneSexuales an annual cycle of feminist conversations open to public, where she gathers well known personalities who share their experiences living in a patriarchal society, and with a focus to propose ways to resolve and improve women's lives as well as providing legal, sexual health, psychological and other support.

Some of these well known speakers have included: TV and Radio personality Nicolas Copano, Music Icon Juan Sativo, photographer Zaida Gonzalez (also sister to Los Prisioneros Jorge González), photographer Gabriela Rivera, Mapuche leader Ana Llao, and singer Planta Carnivora.

Literary career 
Marcela del Sol started writing at a very early age. She constantly represented her school at literary competitions. Her first publication was at around age 14: a piece of poetry for a local government newsletter.

As an adult and among other non-related jobs, she worked as a Ghostwriter specializing in well known personalities’ biographies until the launch of her first self-signed book "Kaleidoscope: my life’s multiple reflections" in 2016. that reached Best Seller status on Amazon.

In December 2016 del Sol launched a regionalized Chilean version titled "Caleidoscopio". The fiction novel tells the story of Lucia, an overly sexual woman who, like the author, lives with D.I.D. and P.T.S.D. and shows the ramifications that sexual abuse has on its victims as well as the intricate and painful ways Lucia has to keep alive and find some solace in a rather discriminating world.

The book sparked controversy due to its highly explicit sexual content and the little known reality of people who have D.I.D. and it has been referred to it as a book that "leaves 50 shades looking as a sweet blushing kiss."

In 2017 Marcela launched her book "InmorTal", a collection of real life stories of sexual violence against Chilean girls and women with strong emphasis on the clergy and upper classes. She invited her friend Gabriela Rivera Lucero, a renowned Chilean feminist photographer who worked with her in Caleidoscopio to collaborate doing a small series of black and white explicit images that were taken during urban interventions at churches and cemeteries as well as studio shots and counted with the assistance of their families and eminent actor Julio Jung who posed next to Marcela. A selection of these photographs was included in the book.

Del Sol has stated that her inspiration to publish InmorTal came from Nabila Rifo, a victim to one of the most violent domestic violence crimes in Chile, having had her eyes gouged by her ex-partner. She felt there was a need to inmortalise Rifo's story, ordeal and strength in order to push society towards effectively fighting gender violence. Marcela met and befriended Nabila Rifo and has been a tireless supporter of hers.
Rifo wrote a few lines as a call to end violence against women, which were included in InmorTal.

Del Sol has been a collaborator in a number of publications in Australia and Chile and participates in social poetry events in Australia.

Works 
Kaleidoscope: my life's multiple reflections (English, 2016)]
Caleidoscopio (Spanish, 2016)
InmorTal (Spanish, 2017)

References 

Living people
Australian women writers
Chilean women writers
Chilean erotica writers
Chilean philanthropists
Chilean activists
Chilean women activists
Chilean feminists
Australian women philanthropists
Australian philanthropists
Australian activists
Australian feminist writers
Australian erotica writers
1973 births